Stephen H. Weiss (1935, Manhattan – April 16, 2008) was an American investment banker, philanthropist, and former chairman of the Cornell University Board of Trustees.

Biography
Weiss was born to a Jewish family and graduated from Cornell in 1957, where he was a member of the Quill and Dagger society. He began a successful banking career at A.G. Becker & Co., where he served as vice president and board member from 1959 to 1970. He then founded the investment management firm Weiss, Peck & Greer together with his brother Roger, Stephen Peck, and Philip Greer, and served as the CEO and chairman of the board until the company was sold to Robeco in 2001.
At Cornell University, Weiss was vice-chairman of the board of Trustees from 1983 to 1989 and became chairman until 1997.
In 1992, he established the Stephen H. Weiss Presidential Fellows Awards "to recognize faculty members with a sustained record of effective and inspiring teaching."

References

External links
 Cornell Website biography

1935 births
2008 deaths
Cornell University alumni
People from Manhattan
American bankers
20th-century American Jews
Philanthropists from New York (state)
American company founders
American chief executives of financial services companies
20th-century American businesspeople
20th-century American philanthropists
21st-century American Jews